The Bride of Hate is a 1917 American silent drama film directed by Walter Edwards and starring Frank Keenan, Margery Wilson, and Jerome Storm.

Cast

References

Bibliography
 Golden, Eve. John Gilbert: The Last of the Silent Film Stars. University Press of Kentucky, 2013.

External links

1917 films
1917 drama films
1910s English-language films
American silent feature films
Silent American drama films
Films directed by Walter Edwards
American black-and-white films
Triangle Film Corporation films
1910s American films